Lasse Krantz (10 August 1903 – 10 January 1973) was a Swedish film actor. He appeared in more than 20 films between 1931 and 1968.

Selected filmography
 How to Tame a Real Man (1941)
 Dolly Takes a Chance (1944)
 The Old Clock at Ronneberga (1944)
 Peggy on a Spree (1946)
 The Wedding on Solö (1946)
 Evening at the Djurgarden (1946)
 A Ship to India (1947)
 Two Women (1947)
 Loffe the Tramp (1948)
 The Kiss on the Cruise (1950)
 The Girl in Tails (1956)
 Woman of Darkness (1966)

References

External links

1903 births
1973 deaths
Swedish male film actors
20th-century Swedish male actors